Alejandro Cota (born July 2, 1977) is a Mexican luchador, or professional wrestler known by his ring name as Mocho Cota Jr., currently working for the Mexican professional wrestling promotion Lucha Libre AAA Worldwide (AAA) portraying a rudo ("bad guy") wrestling character. He is the son of the original Mocho Cota and had a brother who worked as Tayco.

Cota is currently part of a trio known as El Nuevo Poder del Norte ("The New Power of the North") along with Tito Santana and Carta Brava Jr. who works for Lucha Libre AAA Worldwide. The trio are former AAA World Trios Champions.

Championships and accomplishments
Lucha Libre AAA Worldwide
AAA Northern Tag Team Championship (3 times) – with Tito Santana
AAA World Trios Championship (3 times) – with Carta Brava Jr. and Soul Rocker/Tito Santana

Luchas de Apuestas record

References

1977 births
Living people
Mexican male professional wrestlers
AAA World Trios Champions